The Concerto for Violin, Piano and Orchestra, K. Anh. 56/315f by Wolfgang Amadeus Mozart is an unfinished work that was written in Mannheim in 1778. It was written for an Academie des Amateurs that was to take place in Mannheim. Mozart himself was to play the piano part and Ignaz Fränzl, the concertmaster of the Mannheim orchestra, was to play the solo violin part.

Mozart only wrote the first 120 bars of the first movement, and only the first 74 bars are completely scored. Alfred Einstein believed that the work was abandoned due to the disbanding of the Mannheim orchestra; however, that had happened earlier that year when the Elector moved to Munich and most of his orchestra followed him, so the Academie des Amateurs replaced the Mannheim orchestra. The most likely explanation for the concerto being abandoned is that Mozart left Mannheim in December 1778, perhaps because the Academie did not start as early as he thought it would. It is unknown why he did not continue working on the concerto on his journey home or when he was back in Salzburg.

In 1990 the British composer Philip Wilby reconstructed and completed the work for The Complete Mozart Edition. Its premiere recording took place in 1990 with violinist Iona Brown and pianist Howard Shelley with the Academy of St Martin in the Fields conducted by Neville Marriner, which was first issued as part of Volume 8 of The Complete Mozart Edition.

References

Mozart Jahrbuch 1991 p. 912

External links

K315f (Anh 56) Concerto for Violin and Piano. Article by Dennis Pajot

Violin concertos by Wolfgang Amadeus Mozart
Piano concertos by Wolfgang Amadeus Mozart
Mozart
Mozart
1778 compositions